Quality & Quantity is an interdisciplinary double-blind peer-reviewed academic journal dealing with methodological issues in the fields of economics, psychology and sociology, mathematics, and statistics. The journal is published by Springer Science+Business Media.

References

External links
 

Sociology journals
Mathematical and statistical psychology journals
Economics journals
English-language journals
Research methods journals
Springer Science+Business Media academic journals
Bimonthly journals